Alice Lucas may refer to:
 Alice Lucas (poet) (1851–1935), poet and translator
 Alice Lucas (politician) (1853–1924), parliamentary candidate